Titus Hill is a mountain located in the Catskill Mountains of New York north of North Kortright. Titus Lake is located on Titus Hill. Middle Brook Hill is located southeast, Streeter Hill is located south, Quaker Hill is located west-southwest, and Fan Hill is located southeast of Titus Hill.

References

Mountains of Delaware County, New York
Mountains of New York (state)